The Ukrainian Catholic Eparchy of Saint Nicholas of Chicago is a Ukrainian Greek Catholic Church ecclesiastical territory or eparchy of the Catholic Church in the whole Western United States and Midwest (except Ohio), Alaska, and Hawaii. , the St. Nicholas Eparchy has 43 churches and missions in the western USA.

The bishop of the eparchy is Venedykt Aleksiychuk . St. Nicholas Ukrainian Catholic Cathedral is the mother church of the eparchy. The Eparchy of Chicago is a suffragan eparchy in the ecclesiastical province of the metropolitan Archeparchy of Philadelphia.

Eparchs of Chicago
 Jaroslav Gabro (1961-1980)
 Innocent Lotocky, O.S.B.M. (1980 - 1993)
 Michael Wiwchar, C.Ss.R. (1993 - 2000), appointed Eparch of Saskatoon
 Richard Seminack (2003 - 2016)
 Venedykt Aleksiychuk, M.S.U. (2017 – present)

Metropolia of Philadelphia for the Ukrainians

The eparchy is one of four suffragan eparchies of the Ukrainian Catholic Metropolia of Philadelphia, which also includes the Ukrainian Catholic Archeparchy of Philadelphia, the Ukrainian Catholic Eparchy of Stamford, and the Ukrainian Catholic Eparchy of Parma.

Parishes
The eparchy governs parishes, which are located in the following states:
Arizona
California
Colorado
Illinois
Indiana
Michigan
Minnesota
Missouri
Nebraska
North Dakota
Oregon
Texas
Utah
Washington
Wisconsin

See also

Ukrainian Catholic National Shrine of the Holy Family
List of the Catholic cathedrals of the United States
List of the Catholic dioceses of the United States
List of bishops

External links
 Ukrainian Catholic Eparchy of St. Nicholas of Chicago Official Site
 St. Joseph Ukrainian Catholic Church
 Immaculate Conception Ukrainian Byzantine Catholic Church, Palatine, IL
 St. John the Prophet, Forerunner and Baptizer Ukrainian Catholic Church, La Mesa, CA
 Dormition of the Mother of God Ukrainian Catholic Parish, Phoenix, AZ
 Nativity of the Mother of God Ukrainian Catholic Church, Springfield, OR

Chicago
Chicago
Christianity in Chicago
Eastern Catholicism in Illinois
Ukrainian-American culture in Chicago
Chicago
Rusyn-American culture in Illinois